Abananote is a genus of butterflies from north-western South America of the subfamily Heliconiinae in the family Nymphalidae. For taxonomic problems regarding this group, see Acraea.

Species
Listed alphabetically within groups:

abana species group
Abananote abana (Hewitson, 1868)
Abananote erinome (C. & R. Felder, 1861)
Abananote radiata (Hewitson, 1868)
hylonome species group:
Abananote euryleuca (Jordan, 1910)
Abananote hylonome (Doubleday, 1844)

References

Acraeini
Nymphalidae of South America
Nymphalidae genera